Red Letter Days is the fourth album by The Wallflowers, released in 2002.

History
The album peaked at #32 on the Billboard 200. Red Letter Days was the first Wallflowers record that featured Jakob Dylan playing a majority of the lead guitar parts. The album had a much more aggressive sound than any of their previous releases, especially the song "Everybody Out of the Water," which they performed on The Late Late Show with Craig Kilborn. The first single and only music video shot was for "When You're On Top."  Although the album contains some profanity (in "Everybody Out of the Water"), it does not carry the Parental Advisory sticker.  It was produced by the band's first guitarist Tobi Miller.

Up to May 2005, Red Letter Days had sold 208,000 copies, according to Nielsen Soundscan.

After years of fetching hundreds of dollars for an original pressing on the open market, Red Letter Days was reissued on LP for its 15th anniversary on November 3, 2017.

Reception
The album received a score of 63 out of 100 from Metacritic, indicating "generally positive reviews." RollingStone called it "a straightforward barnburner of an album" while Mojo commented that "The Wallflowers make some of the best radio-friendly hooks and melodies around." 
In retrospect, singer Jakob Dylan has mixed feelings about the album. He told Uproxx that "That record is difficult for me to listen to. I don’t think it sounds as good as the other records. There’s a sheen to that record that confuses me...I do like the songs on it quite a bit and I play some of those songs still. But as a record, I feel like we may have veered off the path a little bit."

Track listing
All songs written by Jakob Dylan
 "When You're on Top" – 3:54
 "How Good It Can Get" – 4:11
 "Closer to You" – 3:17
 "Everybody Out of the Water" – 3:42
 "Three Ways" – 4:19
 "Too Late to Quit" – 3:54
 "If You Never Got Sick" – 3:44
 "Health and Happiness" – 4:03
 "See You When I Get There" – 3:09
 "Feels Like Summer Again" – 3:48
 "Everything I Need" – 3:37
 "Here in Pleasantville" – 4:10
 "Empire in My Mind" (hidden track) – 3:32

Japanese bonus tracks
"Empire in My Mind" (Original version)
"(What's So Funny 'Bout) Peace, Love, and Understanding" (Nick Lowe)

Other media
"Everybody Out of the Water" has been used in an episode of CSI: Crime Scene Investigation, and "The Empire in My Mind" was the main theme of the television series The Guardian for its second and third seasons.

Personnel
The Wallflowers
Mario Calire – drums, backing vocals
Jakob Dylan – guitars, lead and backing vocals
Rami Jaffee – keyboards
Greg Richling – bass guitar

Additional personnel
Rusty Anderson – Guitar
Jamie Caliri – Art direction, packaging, photography
David Campbell – String arrangements
Lenny Castro – Percussion
Marina Chavez – Cover photo
Ed Churney – Mixing
Femio Hernández – Assistant engineer
Courtney Kaiser – Background vocals
Ken Kraus – Legal advisor
Bill Lane – Engineer, engineering consultant
Tom Lord-Alge – Mixing
Stephen Marcussen – Mastering
Val McCallum – Guitar
Mike McCready – Guitar
Moe Z M.D. – Background vocals
Ben Peeler – Lap steel guitar
Dave Reed – Engineer
Bob Salcedo – Engineer
Louie Teran – Editing
Darrell Thorp – Assistant engineer
Rich Tosi – Assistant engineer
Robert Vosgien – Mastering
Miles Wilson – Assistant engineer
Ed Wong – Studio technician

Charts

References

2002 albums
Interscope Records albums
The Wallflowers albums
Albums arranged by David Campbell (composer)
Albums recorded at Sound City Studios